Saira Khan is a Pakistani former film and television actress. She is known for her acting in Ghunghat and Dream Girl. She left showbusiness for her faith.

Career
Saira Khan is from Multan. She left home because of her matric result. She feared that due to her poor examination result, her father would treat her harshly, so she eloped. In Lahore, she met a studio owner who arranged a photo-shoot of Saira, and delivered her portfolio to a film director. Her portfolio impressed the director, and he signed her for his new project. Saira worked in both media, film and television. She also performed in several music videos. Her successful feature films include Ghunghat (1996) and Dream Girl (1997) — in which, she played prominent roles. Her successful television series are Prandah (1998); and the drama that led her to fame,  Beti (2005).

Saira left showbusiness, calling the industry full of lies and deceits. She is now living in Johar Town, Lahore along with her husband and children. She has started taking part in preaching activities of Islam, and observes ruband.

Television

Drama serials

Filmography

References

Living people
Actresses from Lahore
Actresses in Urdu cinema
Pakistani Muslims
People from Lahore
People from Multan
Punjabi people
Lux Style Award winners
20th-century Pakistani actresses
21st-century Pakistani actresses
Year of birth missing (living people)